is a former Japanese football player.

Club statistics

Team honors 
J1 League - 2007, 2008
Emperor's Cup - 2007

References

External links 

1982 births
Living people
Komazawa University alumni
Association football people from Chiba Prefecture
Japanese footballers
J1 League players
J2 League players
Kashima Antlers players
JEF United Chiba players
Cerezo Osaka players
Tokyo Verdy players
Universiade gold medalists for Japan
Universiade medalists in football
Association football midfielders